St Nicholas Catholic High School is a mixed voluntary aided school and sixth form in Hartford, near Northwich, Cheshire for students aged 11 to 18. Since 2017, the head teacher has been Richard Woods. The students who enroll there study for 5 years and after GCSEs, they have the possibility of going to the associated Sixth Form.

History
St Nicholas Catholic High School opened as a secondary modern on 6 September 1965, with Mr. Michael O'Connor as its first head teacher and Father R. Velarde, Parish Priest of St. Wilfrid's, Northwich as the first Chairman of Governors. It was the first Catholic secondary school in mid-Cheshire.

In 1972, the school became a comprehensive, and changed its name to St Nicholas High School. At the same time, a new science and languages block was built to the side of the original building. In 1979, a new sixth form block was opened by Mark Carlisle, the Secretary of State for Education. Remodelled science laboratories followed in 1989, and a music suite and additional science laboratories in 1992.

In 1995, O'Connor retired after 30 years as headmaster, and was succeeded by Gerard Boyle. In 2003, the school was awarded Business and Enterprise status. The school also holds the Eco-Schools Green Flag, Healthy Schools status and the Inclusion Quality Mark.

St Nicholas has extended and refurbished the originally standing Sports Hall with Science and Language rooms at the rear at a total cost of £11.5m, as well as a refurbished Sixth Form Centre and new Geography rooms.

Following the retirement of Gerard Boyle at the end of the 2009 term, his successor was Kieran Kelly.

Ofsted
In its 2004 Ofsted inspection, the school and sixth form was rated "very good". In the July 2011 inspection, it was rated "outstanding". The school was reassessed in 2019 has been downgraded to "good", following Richard Wood's appointment as headteacher, due to the declining performance of students in mathematics. Richard Woods will be stepping down as headteacher in January 2023.

Catchment area
As there are few Catholic high schools in Cheshire, St Nicholas'  catchment area extends as far away as Helsby and Knutsford. It also includes Barnton, Davenham, Kingsmead, Middlewich, Weaverham and Winsford. The Sixth Form catchment area also includes the area of St. Thomas More Catholic High School in Crewe, which does not have its own sixth form. Buses run from all the mentioned towns and villages to and from St Nicholas, but due to recent cuts the bus service has come under threat.

Residentials and retreats
Residentials and retreats are normally organised during the month of January. Year 7 pupils usually stay at Conwy Centre in Anglesey for five days. Usually, Year 7 pupils go on a retreat day to St Josephs Catholic Primary School. Year 9 pupils usually stay and do mock SATS in residential week. Year 10 pupils have attended retreats to Savio House in Bollington, Cheshire for a number of years, more recently some have attended retreats at Brettargh Holt in Cumbria and Middleton Grange in North Yorkshire.

Former pupils
 Maeve McClenaghan - Investigative journalist and author
 Nicky Maynard – footballer
 David Mannix – footballer
 Lucy Meggit – singer with Fast Food Rockers
Evan Mitchell- Disability rights campaigner

References

External links
 School homepage

Catholic secondary schools in the Diocese of Shrewsbury
Secondary schools in Cheshire West and Chester
Educational institutions established in 1965
1965 establishments in England
Voluntary aided schools in England